Nicholas H. Smith (born November 5, 1934) is an American politician from the U.S. state of Michigan, who served as a Republican member of the United States House of Representatives from 1993 until 2005, representing from the 7th District of Michigan.

Life and career
Smith was born in Addison, Michigan, where he still lives. He earned a B.A. from Michigan State University in East Lansing, Michigan, in 1957 and an M.S. in Economics from the University of Delaware in 1959. Smith served in the United States Air Force from 1959 to 1961 where he became a captain. He was Squadron Commander in the Civil Air Patrol and later an Intelligence Officer. He operates a dairy farm in Addison.

Smith served on the Somerset Township board of trustees, 1962 to 1968. He was township supervisor and on the Hillsdale County board of supervisors from 1966 to 1968. He then served as assistant deputy administrator and director of energy in the United States Department of Agriculture between 1972 and 1974.

Smith served as a member of the Michigan State House of Representatives from the 41st District from 1979 to 1983. He then served as a member of Michigan Senate from the 19th District from 1983 to 1993. While in the Michigan Senate, he was appointed President Pro Tempore from 1983 to 1990.

Smith ran for Congress in the 7th District in 1992, winning the Republican primary by seven points. His nearest opponent was fellow state senator Joe Schwarz, a considerably more moderate Republican. Smith was the major candidate from the eastern portion of the district, while Schwarz and the others were all from the western portion. The candidates from the western portion split the vote, allowing Smith to win despite getting only 37 percent of the vote. No Democrat even filed for the general election, handing the seat to Smith. He was reelected five times.

Smith was a relatively low-profile congressman for most of his career, compiling a reliably conservative voting record despite representing a fairly marginal district. However, Smith gained national attention in 2004 in the controversy over the Medicare Modernization Act. Smith had announced earlier he was not running for reelection later that year, having promised during his initial run to only serve six terms (12 years) in the House. However, he'd endorsed his son, Brad, as his successor. Smith stated that members of the House Republican leadership told him that if he voted for the Medicare bill, business interests would give $100,000 to his son's campaign. When Nick Smith refused to vote for the bill, he was told that his son would never get into Congress. Ultimately, Brad Smith was defeated in the Republican primary by Schwarz, who was elected in November.

In March 2004, the House Ethics Committee admonished fellow Representative from Michigan Candice Miller and House Majority Leader Tom DeLay for their involvement in the affair.

See also 
 Matt Latimer, former Congressional staffer for Smith

References

External links

The Political Graveyard

1934 births
Living people
American Congregationalists
Republican Party members of the Michigan House of Representatives
Republican Party Michigan state senators
Michigan State University alumni
People from Hillsdale County, Michigan
United States Air Force officers
University of Delaware alumni
Republican Party members of the United States House of Representatives from Michigan
20th-century American politicians
21st-century American politicians
People of the Civil Air Patrol
Military personnel from Michigan